Igor Georgiyevich Kolodinsky (born July 7, 1983) is a Russian male volleyball player and a former beach volleyball player. On club level he plays for Fakel Novy Urengoy.

He was born in Magdeburg, Germany, and competed for Russia at the 2008 Summer Olympics in Beijing, China in beach volleyball.

In August 2008 at the A1 Beach Volleyball Grand Slam presented by NOKIA in Klagenfurt, Austria, Kolodinsky and teammate Dmitri Barsouk won their first Swatch FIVB World Tour gold medal.

Kolodinsky currently (per August 2008) holds the records for the fastest serve in the Swatch FIVB World Tour history. He served at 114.0 km/h at the Italian Open presented by Abruzzo in Roseto degli Abruzzi, Italy.

References

External links
 

1983 births
Living people
Russian men's volleyball players
Russian beach volleyball players
Men's beach volleyball players
Beach volleyball players at the 2008 Summer Olympics
Olympic beach volleyball players of Russia
VC Zenit Saint Petersburg players